= Sardar Patel Museum =

Coordinates: 21°10′13″N 72°47′44″E

The Sardar Patel Museum is in Surat, Gujarat, India, and was established in 1891 (134 years ago). At the time of establishment, the museum was well known as the Winchester Museum. The museum was named Sardar Patel Museum after independence. The museum is also known as Sardar Sangrahalaya.

The museum consists of a planetarium, ancient relics, paintings, science gallery, amphitheater, art gallery, auditorium and restaurant. The audio in the auditorium will be in three languages-Hindi, Gujarati and English. The museum has more than eight thousand relics and antiques.

It was organized in 1890.
